Das or DAS may refer to:

Organizations 
 Dame Allan's Schools, Fenham, Newcastle upon Tyne, England
 Danish Aviation Systems, a supplier and developer of unmanned aerial vehicles
 Departamento Administrativo de Seguridad, a former Colombian intelligence agency
 Department of Applied Science, UC Davis
 Debt Arrangement Scheme, Scotland, see Accountant in Bankruptcy

Places
 Das (crater), a lunar impact crater on the far side of the Moon
 Das (island), an Emirati island in the Persian Gulf
 Das Island Airport 
 Das, Catalonia, a village in the Cerdanya, Spain
 Das, Iran, a village in Razavi Khorasan Province
 Great Bear Lake Airport, Northwest Territories, Canada (IATA code)

Science
 1,2-Bis(dimethylarsino)benzene, a chemical compound
 DAS28, Disease Activity Score of 28 joints, rheumatoid arthritis measure
 Differential Ability Scales, cognitive and achievement tests

Technology
 Data acquisition system
 Defensive aids system, an aircraft defensive system
 Digital Access Service, a system for exchanging legal documents electronically
 Direct-attached storage, a digital storage system
 Distributed acoustic sensing, systems use fiber optic cables to provide distributed strain sensing
 Distributed antenna system, a network of spatially separated antenna nodes
 Distributed Aperture System, a type of infrared search and track sensors
 Double acting ship, trademark for a type of ice-breaking ship
 Draw a Secret, a graphical password scheme
AN/AAQ-37 Electro-optical Distributed Aperture System, sensor system of the Lockheed Martin F-35 Lightning II
 Dual Axis Steering, on the Mercedes-AMG F1 W11 EQ Performance

Other uses 
 Das (surname), a common surname or title in the Indian subcontinent
 Das or dasa, Sanskrit word meaning servant
 Das (studio), a Japanese adult video studio
 Das, the German grammatical neuter article, equivalent to "the" in English

See also 
 DSA (disambiguation)